Janez Jernej Bosio  was a politician of the 17th century in Slovenia, when the country was under the Holy Roman Empire. He became mayor of Ljubljana in 1679 and served for a period of nine years, making him one of the longest serving mayors of the city. He was succeeded by Gabriel Eder in 1688.

References

Mayors of places in the Holy Roman Empire
Mayors of Ljubljana
Year of birth missing
Year of death missing
17th-century Slovenian politicians